is a Japanese singer, actress and model, known for her songs Ja Ja Uma ni Sasenaide and Don't mind Lay Lay Boy from the Ranma ½ anime. In 1992 she became a gravure idol, releasing several nude photobooks and videos. She also starred in a couple feature films.

Music
 Ja Ja Uma ni Sasenaide (Don't Make Me a Shrew; also known as "Don't Make Me Wild Like You")
 Don't mind Lay Lay Boy (Don't Mind China Boy)

Photobooks
Illusion (1992)
Charm (1992)
Finger (1994)
DayDream (1995)
Theatre Named Desire (欲望という名の劇場, 1996)
Movement 1 (2003)

External links
 

Japanese actresses
Japanese women pop singers
1973 births
Living people
People from Toyota, Aichi
Models from Aichi Prefecture
Musicians from Aichi Prefecture
Actors from Aichi Prefecture
21st-century Japanese singers
21st-century Japanese women singers